Northern Sound may refer to:

 Shannonside Northern Sound, a dual-franchise radio station in Ireland covering counties Cavan, Monaghan, Leitrim, Longford and Roscommon
 NorthernSound, a 2019 compilation album released by the Canadian record label 6ixBuzz